Marvin Cohen (born July 6, 1931) is an American essayist, novelist, playwright, poet, humorist, and surrealist. He is the author of nine published books, two of which were published by New Directions Publishing, and several plays. His shorter writings — stories, parables, allegories, and essays — have appeared in more than 80 publications, including The New Yorker, The New York Times, The Village Voice, The Nation, Harper's Bazaar, Vogue, Fiction, The Hudson Review, Quarterly Review of Literature, Transatlantic Review and New Directions annuals. His 1980 play The Don Juan and the Non-Don Juan was first performed at the New York Shakespeare Festival as part of the Poets at the Public Series. Staged readings of the play have featured actors Richard Dreyfuss, Keith Carradine, Wallace Shawn, Jill Eikenberry, Larry Pine, and Mimi Kennedy.

Life and career
Cohen was born in Brooklyn, New York City. He has described himself as one who has "risen from lower-class background to lower-class foreground." He studied art at Cooper Union but left college to focus on writing. He supported himself with a series of odd jobs including mink farmer and merchant seaman. Although not typically associated with the Beat Generation, his first published piece appeared in The Beat Scene (Corinth Books, 1960) along with works by Jack Kerouac, Allen Ginsberg, Gregory Corso, and Lawrence Ferlinghetti. Cohen also taught creative writing at The New School, the City College of New York, C.W. Post of Long Island University, and Adelphi University. He is married and currently lives with his wife in New York City.

Works
Books
 The Self-Devoted Friend (1967) New Directions Publishing/Rapp & Whiting
 Dialogues (1967) Turret Books
 The Monday Rhetoric of the Love Club and Other Parables (1973) New Directions Publishing/Rapp & Whiting
 Baseball the Beautiful: Decoding the Diamond (1974) Links Books
 Fables at Life's Expense (1975) Serendipity Books
 Others, Including Morstive Sternbump (1976) Bobbs-Merrill Company
 The Inconvenience of Living (1977) Urizen Books
 How the Snake Emerged from the Bamboo Pole but Man Emerged from Both (1978) Oasis Books / Earthgrip Press
 Aesthetics in Life and Art (1982) Gull Books
 How to Outthink a Wall: An Anthology (2016) Verbivoracious Press
 Others, Including Morstive Sternbump: 40th Anniversary Edition (2016) Tough Poets Press
 The Self-Devoted Friend: 50th Anniversary Edition (2017) Tough Poets Press
 Baseball as Metaphysics (2017) Tough Poets Press
 Five Fictions (2018) Tough Poets Press
 Inside the World: As Al Lehman (2018) Sagging Meniscus Press
 Women, and Tom Gervasi (2018) Sagging Meniscus Press
 Run Out of Prose (2018) Sagging Meniscus Press
 Sadness Corrected: New Poems & Dialogues (2019) Sagging Meniscus Press
 Life's Tumultuous Party: Reduced to its Essential Partycycles (2020) Sagging Meniscus Press
 Plays on Words (2020) Tough Poets Press
 Conversations and Versifications (2021) Tough Poets Press
 Questions to Ask Before Proceeding (2021) Tough Poets Press
 The Hard Life of a Stone and Other Thoughts (2021) Sagging Meniscus Press
 Booboo Roi (2021) Sagging Meniscus Press

Plays
 The Don Juan and the Non-Don Juan (1980)
 Reasonable Resignation (1981)
 Necessary Ends (1982)
 Anti-Nuclear Love (or Love Unfairly Tested) (1982)
 Phonies (1982)
 Spiritualistically Predestined Judy, Yes, But Which One? (1982)
 Topsy-Turvy (1985)

Notes

External links
 marvincohen.net
 New Directions Publishing Company - Marvin Cohen 
 Reader's Almanac, December 24, 1976 Marvin Cohen discusses his sixth book and first novel, Others, Including Morstive Sternbump. Interview with Walter James Miller, WNYC-FM, New York Public Radio.
 Reader's Almanac, February 6, 1978 Marvin Cohen talks about his book The Inconvenience of Living. Interview with Walter James Miller, WNYC-FM, New York Public Radio.
 Village Voice, November 23, 2016 Surreal Genius: Why Onetime Literary Hotshot Marvin Cohen Deserves Another Look
 Fiction  Writers Review, June 12, 2017 The Drumbeat of Society: An Interview with Marvin Cohen

20th-century American novelists
1931 births
Living people
Poets from New York (state)
20th-century American dramatists and playwrights
American essayists
Writers from Brooklyn
American male poets
American male dramatists and playwrights
Cooper Union alumni
The New School faculty
City College of New York faculty
C.W. Post College faculty
Adelphi University faculty
Novelists from New York (state)
American male essayists
20th-century American male writers